Afristreptaxis vosseleri is a species of air-breathing land snail, a terrestrial pulmonate gastropod mollusk in the family Streptaxidae.

This species is endemic to Tanzania.

References

 Thiele. J. (1911). Mollusken der deutschen Zentral-Afrika-Expedition. Wissenschaftliche Ergebnisse der deutschen Zentral-Afrika-Expedition, 1907–1908. Band III, Zoologie I. Leipzig: Klinkhardt & Biermann. Pp. 175–214 page(s): 185, pl. IV, fig. 27.

External links
 Rowson, B. (2010). Systematics and diversity of the Streptaxidae (Gastropoda: Stylommatophora). Ph.D. thesis, University of Wales, Cardiff. Pp. i–vii + 1–307

Streptaxidae
Endemic fauna of Tanzania
Invertebrates of Tanzania